"So Good" is a song by English R&B girl group Eternal, released on 8 August 1994 as the fourth single from their debut album, Always & Forever (1993). It was their first single to miss the UK Singles Chart top 10, peaking at  13 on 21 August 1994.

Critical reception
Annette M. Lai from the Gavin Report described "So Good" as "very catchy". In his weekly UK chart commentary, James Masterton wrote, "If anything this single is one of their best yet, more of a straight pop song than any of the others and the sort of track that is best appreciated on the car radio on a blazing hot day with the top down. In effect they have timed it to perfection." Pan-European magazine Music & Media commented, "Not so good as "Stay", but as long as the intention is real, they'll come a long way. The various remixes will please many market segments. If that won't do it, the free pictures will." Alan Jones from Music Week gave the  song four out of five, concluding with that "the UK's premier girl group have another surefire hit with this classy record." James Hamilton from the RM Dance Update described it as a "huskily melodic soul shuffler".

Music video
The accompanying music video for "So Good" was directed by American director and editor Tim Royes. It was filmed at Times Square in New York City in July 1994 and features the group wearing matching all-white suits.

Track listings

 UK CD1
 "So Good" (Tree Men Full On mix)
 "So Good" (West End Big Organ mix)
 "So Good" (West End Dope Jam mix)
 "So Good" (Joe and Pain remix)

 UK CD2
 "So Good" (West End remix)
 "So Good" (West End Dope Jam mix)
 "Ain't No How I'm Steppin"
 "Loving You"

 UK 7-inch and cassette single
 "So Good" (West End remix)
 "Ain't No How I'm Steppin"

 Australian CD single
 "So Good" (West End remix)
 "So Good" (West End Dope Jam mix)
 "Ain't No How I'm Steppin"
 "Loving You"
 "Just a Step from Heaven" (radio mix)

Credits and personnel
Credits are lifted from the Always & Forever album booklet.

Studio
 Recorded at Sarm Studios (London, England)

Personnel
 Eternal – writing
 Nigel Lowis – all instruments, production, mixing
 Ren Swan – mixing, engineering

Charts

References

1993 songs
1994 singles
EMI Records singles
Eternal (band) songs
First Avenue Records singles
Songs written by Louise Redknapp